The 26th Infantry Division (26-ya Pekhotnaya Diviziya) was an infantry formation of the Russian Imperial Army.

Organization
1st Brigade
101st Infantry Regiment
102nd Infantry Regiment
2nd Brigade
103rd Infantry Regiment
104th Infantry Regiment
26th Artillery Brigade

Commanders
August 15, 1863 - July 21, 1866 - Major General (from March 27, 1866 Lieutenant General) Alexander Semyonovich Kovalevsky
July 21, 1866 - xx.xx, 1869 - Major General (from August 30, 1867 Lieutenant General) Viktor Danilovich Krenke
05/02, 1869 - xx.08, 1878 - Major General (from March 28, 1871 Lieutenant General) Baron Eduard Karlovich Dellingshausen
хх.хх.1878 - March 14, 1879 - Lieutenant-General Andrey Davidovich Gorshkov
03/14/1879 - 01/20, 1888 - Major General (from 04/12/1881 Lieutenant General) Nikolai Nikolayevich Malakhov
01/20/1888 - 01/01, 1898 - Major General (from 08/30/1888 Lieutenant General) Prince Shcherbatov, Alexander Petrovich
10.01.1898 - 12.06, 1898 - Lieutenant General Maksimov, Ivan Ivanovich
06/20/1898 - 09/26, 1898 - Major General Razgonov, Konstantin Iosifovich
17.12.1898 - 10.07, 1899 - Lieutenant General von Raaben, Rudolf Samoilovich
07.26.1899 - 07.14, 1902 - Major General (from 06.12.1899 Lieutenant General) Capital, Konstantin Akimovich
07.22.1902 - 09.17.1903 - Lieutenant General Pototsky, Ivan Platonovich
09/27/1903 - 02/17/1907 - Lieutenant General Buturlin, Dmitry Sergeevich
02/17, 1907 - 10/29, 1907 - Major General (from April 22, 1907 Lieutenant General) Shchagin, Vasily Vasilievich
11/09, 1907 - August 23, 1913 - Lieutenant General Kaigorodov, Mikhail Nikiforovich
September 24, 1913 - January 16, 1915 - Lieutenant General Poretsky, Alexander Nikolaevich
January 16, 1915 - August 25, 1915 - Major General Tikhanovich, Pyotr Andreevich
August 25, 1915 - 08/11, 1916 - Major General Fyodor Ogorodnikov
08/11, 1916 - 04/10, 1917 - Lieutenant General Baranov, Pyotr Mikhailovich
04/10, 1917 -? - Major General Klimovsky, Pavel Petrovich
09.1917 - 04.1918 - Colonel Vasily Shorin (elected)

Chiefs of Staff
August 30, 1863 - 10/13, 1867 - Lieutenant Colonel (from 07/22/1864 Colonel) Zverev, Nikolai Yakovlevich
earlier 08.02, 1869 - 25.05, 1875 - lieutenant colonel (from 30.08.1869 colonel) Vodar, Vasily-Georgiy-Karl Karlovich
06/07/1875 - 05/30/1878 - Colonel Yunakov, Leonty Avksentyevich
May 30, 1878 - January 25, 1883 - Colonel Karpov, Alexander Fedorovich
January 25, 1883 - September 21, 1887 - Colonel Stog, Mikhail Demyanovich
2 October, 1887 - xx.xx.1891 - Colonel Munk av Fulkila, Leonard Alekseevich
07/01/1891 - 09/25/1892 - Colonel Bertels, Ostap Andreevich
09.25.1892 - 10.16.1898 - Colonel Probenko, Porfiry Gerasimovich
11/25/1898 - 07/04/1902 - Colonel Batashev, Nikita Mikhailovich
08/02/1902 - 03/04/1904 - Colonel Popov, Ippolit Ivanovich
03/22/1904 - 08/01/1905 - Colonel Kiselevsky, Nikolai Mikhailovich
09.21.1905 - 05.10.1906 - Colonel Thalgren, Vladimir Pavlovich
05/10/1906 - 07/21/1910 - Colonel Vakhrushev, Mikhail Nikolaevich
08/02/1910 - 03/21/1911 - Colonel Panov, Philip Petrovich
04/08/1911 - 12/27/1914 - Colonel Rudnitsky, Nikolai Kvintilyanovich
01.16.1915 - 05.16.1915 - I. D. Colonel Menchukov, Evgeny Alexandrovich
06/14/1915 - 06/10/1916 - Lieutenant Colonel Dorofeev, Konstantin Konstantinovich
06/10/1916 - хх.хх.1917 - and. D. Lieutenant Colonel (from 15.08.1917 Colonel) Malevanov, Vladimir Lvovich

Commanders of the 1st Brigade
earlier 11/01/1873 - 08/30/1874 - Major General Dekonsky, Pyotr Kozmich
09/12/1874 - 10/01/1874 - Major General Kuzmin, Ilya Alexandrovich
10/01/1874 - 03/14/1879 - Major General Nikolai Nikolayevich Malakhov
03/14/1879 - 05/07/1892 - Major General Mrochkevich, Ignatiy Feliksovich
05/10/1892 - 07/26/1899 - Major General Capital, Konstantin Akimovich
09/06/1899 - 03/03/1900 - Major General Kesyakov, Konstantin Iskrovich
04/05/1900 - 12/21/1902 - Major General Stakhiev, Pyotr Alexandrovich
01/28/1903 - 05/10/1910 - Major General Kannabich, John-Philip-Wilhelm Alexandrovich
05/10/1910 - 07/19/1914 - Major General Iosefovich, Felix Dominikovich
07.26.1914 - 08.27.1914 - Major General Druzhinin, Konstantin Ivanovich

Commanders of the 2nd Brigade
earlier 11/01, 1873 - February 26, 1874 - Major General Grenkvist, Fyodor Ivanovich
February 26, 1874 - February 27, 1875 - Major General Kutnevich, Boris Gerasimovich
February 27, 1875 - March 22, 1875 - Major General Mushnikov, Alexander Egorovich
March 22, 1875 - July 10, 1884 - Major General Bizyaev, Ivan Semyonovich
July 20, 1884 - April 24, 1889 - Major General Syrotsynsky, Vladimir Mironovich
April 24, 1889 - November 28, 1890 - Major General Stepanov, Konstantin Savelievich
December 12, 1890 - 22 April, 1892 - Major General Buturlin, Sergei Sergeevich
May 4, 1892 - September 15, 1900 - Major General Gek, Andrey Konstantinovich
October 10, 1900 - 30 January, 1906 - Baron von Funk, Maximilian Wilhelmovich
January 30, 1906 - December 13, 1908 - Major General Krause, Nikolai Fridrikhovich
01/08, 1909 - 11/09, 1913 - Major General Przhetslavsky, Nikolai Nikolaevich
11/09, 1913 - 11/10, 1914 - Major General Larionov, Yakov Mikhailovich

Commanders of the 26th Artillery Brigade
earlier January 1, 1867 - after 05.02, 1870 - Colonel Simanov, Dmitry Stepanovich
earlier March 15, 1872 - xx.xx, 1876 - Colonel (from 08/30/1873 Major General) Shestakov, Georgy Fedorovich
xx.xx.187x - 03/25, 1877 - Major General Kostogorov, Yakov Mikhailovich
March 25, 1877 - xx.xx.187x - Colonel Lingen, Ferdinand Alexandrovich
October 22, 1878 - 09/07, 1889 - Colonel (from 08/30/1879 Major General) Kobylinsky, Stepan Osipovich
09/07, 1889 - March 16, 1892 - Major General Tsilliacus, Vasily Vladimirovich
March 16, 1892 - March 16, 1899 - Major General Bobrovsky, Vladimir Osipovich
December 29, 1899 - November 13, 1903 - Colonel (from 04/09/1900 Major General) Velyamovich, Alexander Feliksovich
13 November, 1903 - 13 August, 1905 - Major General Aliyev, Eris Khan Sultan Girey
1906 - Colonel Zheltov, Mikhail Konstantinovich
September 22, 1906 - July 25, 1910 - Colonel (from 05/31/1907 Major General) Romishevsky, Modest Vladislavovich
July 25, 1910 - 08.07, 1913 - Major General Mamantov, Vladimir Petrovich
August 30, 1913 - 11/09, 1913 - Major General Zaretsky, Georgy Karpovich
11/09, 1913 - October 22, 1915 - Major General Zaets, Nikolai Alekseevich

References

Infantry divisions of the Russian Empire
Military units and formations disestablished in 1918